Aleksey Kuznetsov (6 September 1941, Chelyabinsk) is a Russian guitarist, composer, and guitar pedagogue. Mainly known as a jazz guitarist on the international stage, he has also worked as a classical musician. He is the author of Iz praktiki dzhazovogo gitarista (From the practice of a jazz guitarist; 1993), an instructional book for aspiring jazz guitarists.

Life and career
In 1962, he graduated with a music performance degree from the Moscow State Pedagogical University. He has since played throughout Russia/USSR, India, and Eastern Europe as both a soloist and ensemble member at major music festivals and concert venues. In the 1990s, he toured regularly as a trio with saxophonist Georgy Garanian and pianist . He also formed and led the jazz quartet Jazz-Accord whose members also included accordion player Vladimir Danilin, pianist Lev Kushnir, and double bassist Anatoly Sobolev. With Jazz-Accord, he has performed many times on Russian television, including appearances with guest musicians Igor Bril and German Luk’yanov. Kuznetsov is the grandson of Marshal of the Soviet Union Alexander Ilyich Yegorov.

References

External links 

 
 Aleksey Kuznetsov discography at Discogs
 This Week in Russian Jazz Podcast jazz.ru 2009

1941 births
Living people
Moscow State Pedagogical University alumni
Musicians from Chelyabinsk
Russian classical guitarists
Russian male guitarists
Russian composers
Russian male composers
Russian jazz guitarists
Male jazz musicians